Ryukichi Terao (寺尾 隆吉) (born 1971 in Nagoya) is a Japanese Hispanist and translator.

Work
Terao has published research work:
 Literaturas al margen (2003)
 La novelística de la violencia en América Latina (2005)

He is renowned for his translations into Japanese of several Latin American writers:
 Gabriel García Márquez
 Julio Cortázar
 Juan Carlos Onetti
 Alejo Carpentier
 Mario Vargas Llosa

He has also translated the work of many notable Japanese writers into Spanish:
 Kenzaburō Ōe
 Junichiro Tanizaki
 Kōbō Abe

References

1971 births
Living people
People from Nagoya
Japanese Hispanists
Japanese translators